The Musée des Antiquités (known until around 2016 as the Musée départemental des Antiquités) is a museum in the French city of Rouen, housing archaeological finds from the department of Seine-Maritime. It is classified as a Museum of France.

It was set up in 1831 to house the finds excavated at Lillebonne at the instigation of prefect Henri Dupont-Delporte. Its first director was Achille Deville and one of its first curators was Jean Benoît Désiré Cochet. It suffered a fire on 21 April 1894.

On 1 January 2016 the museum moved to the Métropole Rouen Normandie and it now forms part of the Réunion des Musées Métropolitains Rouen Normandie network.

References 

 Jules Vernier, Musée des Antiquités de la Seine-Inférieure : Guide du visiteur, Albert Lainé, Rouen, 1923.
 Le Musée départemental des antiquités de Seine-Maritime1991 .
 Patrick Périn, « Les objets vikings du musée des Antiquités de la Seine-Maritime », in Recueil d’études en hommage à Lucien Musset, Cahier des Annales de Normandie, no 23, Caen, 1990.
 Musée des antiquités, Rouen, De l'Égypte ancienne à la Renaissance rouennaise, Rouen, 1992 .
 Geneviève Sennequier, Les Mosaïques du Musée départemental des antiquités, Rouen, Musées départementaux de la Seine-Maritime, 2002.
 Michel Hérold, conseil général de la Seine-Maritime, 33 p. .

Archaeological museums in France
Museums in Rouen
1831 establishments in France